The Guardian's Son is a Greek film directed by Dimitris Koutsiabasakos. It released in 2006 and it stars Nikolas Aggelis, Apostolis Totsikas, Dimitris Tzoumakis and Eleni Vergeti. The film won the second best film award and the best first film director award in the Greek State Film Awards. The film was shot in the Aspropotamos area, in the Pindus range.

Plot
The four young people make a good relationship and help Ilias, the guardian's son, to a mission that he had drawn.

Cast
Nikolas Aggelis 	
Apostolis Totsikas	
Dimitris Tzoumakis 		
Eleni Vergeti 	
Yiorgos Spanias 	
Nikos Zoiopoulos

Awards

References

External links

Greek drama films
2006 films